Thomas Allen Brown (May 24, 1937 – April 4, 2020), known also as Timothy Brown and Timmy Brown, was an American actor, singer, and professional football player. He played in the National Football League (NFL) as a running back and kick returner.

Early life
Born in Richmond, Indiana, Brown was raised in Knightstown, east of Indianapolis. Brown is a 1955 graduate of Morton Memorial High School at the Indiana Soldiers' and Sailors' Children's Home.

Football career
Brown played college football in state at Ball State College in Muncie, Indiana. Selected late in the 1959 NFL draft, as a pro – when he was known mainly as "Timmy" Brown – he played a single game with the Green Bay Packers, eight seasons with the Philadelphia Eagles, and one season with the Baltimore Colts, all of the National Football League (NFL). He scored the last touchdown in the 1968 NFL Championship Game and his final game was two weeks later in Super Bowl III with the Colts.

Brown went to the Pro Bowl in 1962, 1963, and 1965. He is the only player in Philadelphia history to return a kickoff 105 yards for a touchdown, and the only Eagle (and the first of nine NFL players ever) to return two kickoffs, 90- and 93-yarders, for touchdowns in the same game. He led the league twice in all-purpose yards (doing so in 1962 and 1963 with 2,306 and 2,428 yards respectively). He also led the league in kick returns and return yards twice, doing so in 1961 and 1963.

Brown also served as a color analyst for CBS NFL telecasts in 1973.

Acting career
Brown used the name "Timothy Brown" as an actor, to make it easier to distinguish him from Jim Brown, the Cleveland Browns running back who also became an actor.

Brown's acting career began while he was still an active player, with a guest appearance on the Season 3 premiere of The Wild Wild West as Clint Cartwheel in the episode titled "The Night of the Bubbling Death", which originally aired on September 8, 1967.

Following his retirement from the NFL, he became a full-time actor, appearing in such films as MASH (1970), Sweet Sugar (1972), Black Gunn (1972), Bonnie's Kids (1973), Girls Are for Loving (1973), Dynamite Brothers (1974), Nashville (1975), Zebra Force (1976), Black Heat (1976), Gus (1976) and Midnight Ride (1990). He also appeared in a half-dozen episodes of the first season of the M*A*S*H television series as Dr. Oliver Harmon "Spearchucker" Jones, but was dropped from the show. While it was reported that was due to the producers learning there were no African American surgeons serving in Korea during the Korean War (which in fact was not true), the producers said it was due to not feeling they could come up with meaningful stories involving that character when they were concentrating on writing stories about the characters Hawkeye and Trapper John. Along with Gary Burghoff, G. Wood, and Corey Fischer, he is one of only four actors who appeared in both the original MASH movie and the spin-off television series.

He made three guest appearances in the 1960s–1970s TV show Adam-12 and appeared in a Season 1 episode of The Mary Tyler Moore Show.

Music

1960s
Brown began singing when he was attending Ball State College. He also took up tap dancing.

In 1962, Brown recorded with Imperial Records (Travis Music Co. & Rittenhouse Music, Inc.) "I Got Nothin' But Time" and "Silly Rumors". The songs were written by N. Meade and V. McCoy and produced and arranged by Jerry Ragavoy.

In 1964, he headed a stage show at the Steel Pier in Atlantic City, New Jersey. When his part of the show came up, Brown backed by a nine piece orchestra started off with "What'd I Say. Other songs he performed were "Do You Want to Know a Secret", "This Land Is Your Land", and "I've Got a Secret". He made a guest appearance on I've Got a Secret, during which he sang a song of the same name.

1970s
In addition to appearing in the 1975 film Nashville, his vocals appeared on the soundtrack.

Brown made a brief appearance on a 1970 episode of The Mary Tyler Moore Show ("Keep Your Guard Up"), opposite guest star and previous MASH co-star John Schuck.  Both played retired NFL players vying for a job as sportscaster.

Discography

Film

Later years
In later years, Brown worked as a correctional officer in Los Angeles. In the 2000s, he had retired and was residing in Palm Springs, California. Brown died on April 4, 2020, of complications from dementia at the age of 82.

References

External links
 
 
 
 

1937 births
2020 deaths
20th-century American male actors
20th-century American singers
20th-century American male singers
American football return specialists
American football running backs
Place of death missing
American male film actors
American male television actors
Ball State Cardinals football players
Baltimore Colts players
Eastern Conference Pro Bowl players
Green Bay Packers players
Male actors from Indiana
National Football League announcers
People from Richmond, Indiana
Philadelphia Eagles players
Players of American football from Indiana